The China Evergrande Group is the second largest property developer in China by sales. It is ranked 122nd on the Fortune Global 500. It is incorporated in the Cayman Islands, a British Overseas Territory, and headquartered in the Houhai Financial Center in Nanshan District, Shenzhen,  Guangdong Province, China. It was founded in 1996 by Xu Jiayin. It sells apartments mostly to upper- and middle-income dwellers. In 2018, it became the most valuable real estate company in the world.

In 2021, the payments Evergrande had to make on its debt started the 2020–2022 Chinese property sector crisis; Evergrande's total debts were estimated in the hundreds of billions of dollars. This was one of the reasons for a drop in many stock market indices on September 20, 2021. At the end of 2021, the Chinese government was reportedly working to restructure Evergrande in order to resolve the crisis. The group also sought a moratorium on the early repayment option on one of its yuan-denominated bonds from its bondholders on 7 January 2022.

In April 2022, Reuters reported that construction had been started again at many projects and that the company still had liabilities of US$300 billion.

History
Formerly called the Hengda Group, Evergrande was founded by Xu Jiayin in the southern Chinese city of Guangzhou in 1996, during a period of mass urbanization in China.

In October 2009, the company raised $722 million U.S. in an initial public offering on the Stock Exchange of Hong Kong (SEHK).

In 2022, the company announced it would move its headquarters to Guangzhou due to a need to reduce spending.

Operations and business interests

Real estate 
Evergrande Group owns  of development land and real estate projects in 22 cities, including Guangzhou, Tianjin, Shenyang, Wuhan, Kunming, Chengdu, Chongqing, Nanjing, Zhengzhou, Luoyang, Changsha, Nanning, Xian, Taiyuan and Guiyang in Mainland China. Notable projects by the company include Ocean Flower Island in Hainan.

Evergrande Real Estate is the second-largest real estate developer in Mainland China. It is known as "Wan Heng Bi" with the other two top three real estate companies: Vanke (Wanke) and Country Garden (Biguiyuan). The firm has developed projects in over 170 cities in Mainland China.

Evergrande Plaza, in Chengdu, was designed by Aedas, and completed in 2014.

Tourism and recreation 
Evergrande owns two major theme park brands "Hengda children of the world", "Hengda water world", and Hainan has a large tourist complex "Chinese island of Hainan to spend". The under-construction Ocean Flower Island in Hainan is one of its major projects.

Sports 

In 2010, it acquired football club Guangzhou Evergrande F.C. and invested heavily to acquire top players. In 2013, under Marcello Lippi, the club won the 2013 AFC Champions League. Alibaba also has a 50% stake in the football club.

On 16 April 2020, Evergrande opened the construction of Guangzhou Evergrande Football Stadium in Xie Village, Panyu District, Guangzhou.

Evergrande Football School is a football tutoring school.

The company was a sponsor of the Women's Guangdong Evergrande Volleyball Club, terminating their contract after 8 years in October 2021.

Automotive 
In 2018, Evergrande acquired a 45% stake in electric vehicle company Faraday Future for $2 billion through its Evergrande Health subsidiary.

In July 2019, the company partnered with State Grid Corporation of China to develop electric vehicle charging stations. Later in November 2019, Evergrande announced that it would invest ¥45 billion over the following three years to develop new energy vehicles, build three production bases in Nansha, Guangzhou and Shanghai, and launch electric vehicles branded as "Evergrande New Energy Vehicle" in 2020, creating the Hengchi electric vehicle brand.

In June 2020, Evergrande Group acquired the remaining 49% of NEVS for $380 million, after having acquired 51% of the shares for $931 million in 2019. Evergrande NEV has stated that it will start making electric cars by 2022.

Health 
In March 2015, Evergrande acquired New Media Group Holdings and renamed it Evergrande Health. Evergrande Health Group operates the "Evergrande Health Valley" in Nanning. The Health Valley is a health and wellness park, and retirement community. It also works with Brigham and Women's Hospital in Massachusetts to manage Boao Evergrande International Hospital in Hainan.

Evergrande Health is both a division and a listed company. However, the listed company portion was renamed into China Evergrande New Energy Vehicle Group Limited in August 2020.

The health division is still part of China Evergrande New Energy Vehicle Group Limited and in turn part of Evergrande Group as of 2021.

Entertainment 
HengTen Networks was formed in 2015 in partnership with Tencent. In October 2020, HengTen Networks announced that it would acquire Ruyi Pictures for HK$7.2 billion. In August 2021, the company sold a 7% stake in HengTen to Tencent for US$418 million. Later in 2021, Evergrande sold off its remaining stake in HengTen, ending their relationship with Tencent.

Finance 
In November 2015, Evergrande acquired a 50% stake in Sino-Singapore Great Eastern Life Insurance Company for $617 million and changed its name to Evergrande Life. It also owns shares in Shengjing Bank. Evergrande has also sold wealth management products to consumers.

Food and agriculture 
In 2014, Evergrande Group launched its "Hengda Bingquan" (later "Evergrande Spring") mineral water brand and invested ¥5.54 billion in it, including hiring Jackie Chan to promote the brand. Evergrande's water brand received significant negative attention from Korean consumers, as the water source on the label was listed as "Jang bai shan" (Changbai mountains) rather than the Korean name "Mount Baekdusan." The use of the Chinese name of the mountain—which borders China and North Korea—is a point of stress between China and South Korea.

In September 2016, after a loss of ¥4 billion, Evergrande sold its agribusiness units, which included its mineral water brand, dairy business, and grain and oil business, for ¥2.7 billion. Later that year, Evergrande announced it was investing ¥300 million to build more than 110 pig farms in southwestern Guizhou province.

Financial data

Financial problems

In 2016, the Hong Kong Market Misconduct Tribunal suspended American short seller and Citron Research founder Andrew Left for five years, due to the publication of a highly critical report on the company, "finding him culpable of disclosing false or misleading information inducing transactions under the Securities and Futures Ordinance (SFO) in the publication of a research report on Evergrande Real Estate Group Limited (Evergrande) in June 2012." The trading ban "has raised concerns over freedom of speech in Hong Kong’s financial markets" according to the New York Times.

In summer of 2021, payments due on its debt, estimated in the hundreds of billions of dollars, resulted in the Evergrande liquidity crisis. This was one of the reasons for a drop in many stock market indices on 20 September 2021. On 21 October 2021, Evergrande announced that a $2.6 billion asset sale that would have been used to pay an $83 million interest payment it missed in September, 2021 had failed to close. On 10 November 2021, Evergrande defaulted on 3 more bonds after missing the grace period for interest payments. Although major news outlets reported they fulfilled the payments after the deadline, these claims can not be verified because anonymous sources are cited in the major financial media outlets about the bond payments since September.

Although the scale of debt is huge, from the perspective of financial data alone, Evergrande has not yet reached the point of "insolvency". According to the aforementioned financial report, Evergrande's current land reserve is worth RMB 456.8 billion, and together with 146 old reform projects, the total value of the land reserve is nearly RMB 2 trillion. In addition, there are many completed commercial properties and holdings, such as the headquarters building in Hong Kong, worth around RMB 10 billion.

On 17 December 2021, Evergrande was officially declared to be in default by S&P Global after missing a bond payment earlier in the month. On 3 January 2022, Evergrande shares were suspended from trading, without a reason being provided by the company. They resumed trading a day later and stock prices rose by 10%. On 15 March 2022, Evergrande's share price sank to a new all-time low of HK$1.16 (US$0.15), down from a high of over HK$31 in October 2017.

On 30 March 2022, Evergrande announced the decision to sell its Crystal City Project in Hangzhou for 3.66 billion yuan to Zhejiang Zhejian Real Estate Group and Zhejiang Construction Engineering Group, using the proceeds to repay construction debt of 920.7 million yuan to Zhejiang Construction Engineering. The deal is expected to post a gain of about 216 million yuan.

See also
Real estate in China

References

External links

2009 initial public offerings
Civilian-run enterprises of China
Companies based in Guangzhou
Companies listed on the Hong Kong Stock Exchange
Real estate companies established in 1996
Real estate companies of China